Songs of Love is the debut studio album by American singer Anita Ward released on Juana. It includes the chart-topping hit single "Ring My Bell". "Make Believe Lovers" was also released as a single but failed to chart. Big Break Records released this album on CD in March 2013.

Track listing

Personnel
 Strings and horns arrangements – Mike Lewis
 Bass guitar – Don Barrett, Ray Griffin
 Drums – James Stroud 
 Engineer – James Griffin
 Guitar – Dino Zimmerman, Fred Knobloch, Michael Terence Ward, Michael Toles 
 Keyboards – Carson Whitsett, Frederick Knight 
 Producer, percussion, electronic drums – Frederick Knight
 Synthesizer – Carl Marsh
 Backing vocals – Cheryl Bundy, Charles Chalmers, Donna Rhodes, Frederick Knight, Sandra Rhodes, Valerie Williams
 Strings and horns – The Miami Symphony
 Photography – Gregory Heisler

Charts

References

External links
Songs of Love by Anita Ward at Discogs
Songs of Love by Anita Ward at Allmusic 
"Songs of Love – The Medicine of Music"

1979 debut albums
Soul albums by American artists
Funk albums by American artists
TK Records albums